Jason Wingreen (October 9, 1920 – December 25, 2015) was an American actor. He portrayed bartender Harry Snowden on the CBS sitcom All in the Family (1977–1979), a role he reprised on the continuation series Archie Bunker's Place (1979–1983). He was also the original voice of Star Wars character Boba Fett in The Empire Strikes Back (1980).

Early years
Born in 1920 in Brooklyn, New York to a Jewish family, he grew up in Howard Beach, Queens, attended John Adams High School, and graduated from Brooklyn College in 1941. While at Brooklyn College, he participated in the Varsity Dramatic Society. Wingreen originally planned to become a newspaper reporter after writing about high school sports for the Brooklyn Eagle during his high school years.

During World War II, he served with the United States Army Air Force and was stationed in England and Germany. Following his return home, with the aid of the G.I. Bill, he studied acting at New York's New School. He was a co-founder of the Circle in the Square Theatre company in New York's Greenwich Village, and he appeared for the first time on Broadway in two 1954 plays: The Girl on the Via Flaminia and Fragile Fox.

Career

Film

In 1958, Wingreen had the role of Nichols in the 20th Century Fox production The Bravados.

Wingreen lent his voice to the bounty hunter Boba Fett (portrayed by Jeremy Bulloch) in the 1980 sequel to Star Wars, The Empire Strikes Back. For the DVD release of the film in 2004, Wingreen's voice was replaced by New Zealand actor Temuera Morrison in continuity with the 2002 prequel Star Wars: Episode II – Attack of the Clones in which the character is revealed to be a clone of Morrison's Jango Fett who acts as Boba's father.

From the early 1960s Wingreen was a voting member of the Academy of Motion Picture Arts and Sciences.

Stage
Wingreen helped to found the Circle in the Square Theatre in Greenwich Village. On Broadway, he played in The Girl on the Via Flaminia and Fragile Fox, both in 1954.

Television

Wingreen was known for his role as bar owner/bartender Harry Snowden on the television sitcom All in the Family and its continuation series, Archie Bunker's Place.

Prior to this, Wingreen was a regular during the 1960–61 season of The Untouchables, playing Police Captain Dorsett. He performed in "A Stop at Willoughby," "The Midnight Sun," and "The Bard," three episodes of the original Twilight Zone series. He also appeared on the original Star Trek series, making him one of the few people involved with both Star Wars and Star Trek.  Wingreen also had a recurring role as Judge Arthur Beaumont in the series Matlock, and has guest-starred in numerous other series, including Mission: Impossible, Outer Limits, Bonanza, The Rockford Files, The Armstrong Circle Theatre, Alcoa Theatre, The Man From U.N.C.L.E., The Many Loves of Dobie Gillis, Dr. Kildare, and The Fugitive.

In 1965, Wingreen portrayed Adolf Hitler on Blue Light.

In 1979, Wingreen was a part of the ensemble cast of the TV mini-series Roots: The Next Generations. In 1991, he guest starred on General Hospital as Judge Mattson.

After an appearance on TV's Seinfeld in the 1990s, Wingreen retired. His last credited TV work was on In The Heat Of The Night in 1994.

Personal life
Wingreen married Gloria Scott Backe. Backe, known as "Scotty" died in 1996. They had one son together.

Death
Wingreen died at the age of 95 at his home in Los Angeles, California, on December 25, 2015. Jeremy Bulloch, who physically portrayed Boba Fett, paid tribute saying that "he will be sadly missed by his family, friends and all the Star Wars fans."

He was survived by his son, theoretical physicist, Ned Wingreen, two grandchildren, and his sister, Harriet, a former pianist for the New York Philharmonic.

Filmography

Film

Television

References

External links

 
 
 

1920 births
2015 deaths
20th-century American male actors
American male film actors
American male stage actors
American male television actors
American male voice actors
Brooklyn College alumni
Jewish American male actors
John Adams High School (Queens) alumni
Male actors from New York City
People from Brooklyn
People from Howard Beach, Queens
The New School alumni
21st-century American Jews